The European Minifootball Federation, also referred to by its abbreviation EMF, is the administrative body for 5-a-side version of minifootball in Europe. It is one of five continental confederations of its governing body, the World Minifootball Federation. EMF consists of 34 national associations.

History and membership
EMF was founded in a meeting held in Prague, Czech Republic, from 23–25 March 2012. EMF started with 11 members and currently has 29 full-time federation members.

Members
Members as listed on EMF website:

  Albania 
  Austria 
  Azerbaijan 
  Belgium 
  Bosnia and Herzegovina
  Bulgaria
  Croatia
  Czech Republic
  Estonia
  Greece 
  Great Britain
  Georgia
  Hungary
  Ireland
  Israel
  Italy
  Kazakhstan
  Kosovo
  Lithuania
  Moldova
  Montenegro
  Netherlands
  North Macedonia
  Poland
  Portugal
  Romania
  Russia
  Serbia
  Slovakia
  Slovenia
  Spain
  Switzerland
  Turkey
  Ukraine

Competitions
EMF's main competition is EMF EURO for national teams, held annually from 2012 to 2018. In 2019 EMF General assembly decided to organize EMF EURO every 2 years in rotation with WMF World Championship. EMF's main club competition is the EMF Champions League. In addition, EMF organizes Euro Business Cup for corporate teams.

Major tournament records

WMF World Cup

 
 
 
 
 — Host(s)

WMF Continental Cup

WMF Women’s World Cup

U23 WMF World Cup

References

External links

Minifootball 
Sports governing bodies in Europe
Sports organizations established in 2012
2012 establishments in Europe